The 1915 Cardiff by-election was held on 12 November 1915.  The by-election was held due to the death of the incumbent Conservative MP, Lord Ninian Crichton-Stuart, who was killed in action in World War I.  It was won by the Conservative candidate James Cory, who was unopposed.

References

1915 elections in the United Kingdom
1915 in Wales
1910s elections in Wales
1910s in Cardiff
Elections in Cardiff
By-elections to the Parliament of the United Kingdom in Welsh constituencies
Unopposed by-elections to the Parliament of the United Kingdom (need citation)